The 2004–05 Divizia B was the 65th season of the second tier of the Romanian football league system.

The format has been maintained to three series, each of them consisting of 16 teams. At the end of the season, the winners of the series promoted to Divizia A and the last three places from all the series relegated to Divizia C.

Team changes

To Divizia B
Promoted from Divizia C
 Botoșani
 Dunărea Galați
 Otopeni
 Ghimbav
 Oltul Slatina
 Politehnica Timișoara
 Unirea Sânnicolau Mare
 Unirea Dej
 FC Sibiu
 Dinamo II București**
 Liberty Salonta**

Relegated from Divizia A
 Ceahlăul Piatra Neamț
 Petrolul Ploiești
 FC Oradea

From Divizia B
Relegated to Divizia C
 Metalul Plopeni
 Medgidia
 Poiana Câmpina
 Rarora Râmnicu Vâlcea
 CSM Reșița
 Oltul Sfântu Gheorghe
 Cimentul Fieni
 FC Baia Mare
 FC Onești
 ARO Câmpulung
 Minaur Zlatna

Promoted to Divizia A
 Politehnica Iași
 Sportul Studențesc
 CFR Cluj

Note (**)
CSM Medgidia sold its Divizia B place to Liberty Salonta.

Metalul Plopeni sold its Divizia B place to Dinamo II București.

Renamed teams
Electrica Constanța was renamed as Altay Constanța.

Electromagnetica București was renamed as Rapid II București.

FC Craiova was moved from Craiova to Caracal and renamed as FC Caracal.

League tables

Seria I

Seria II

Seria III

Top scorers 
14 goals
  Dumitru Gheorghe (Unirea Urziceni)
  Daniel Stan (FC Oradea)

12 goals
  Gabriel Apetri (Jiul Petroșani)
  Claudiu Boaru   (Gaz Metan Mediaș)

11 goals
  Emil Jula (Universitatea Cluj)
  Valentin Badea (FC Vaslui)

10 goals
  Iulian Ștefan (Pandurii Târgu Jiu)
  Cristian Constantin (Unirea Urziceni)

9 goals
  Romeo Buteseacă (Dacia Unirea Brăila)

8 goals
  Tihamer Török (FC Vaslui)

7 goals

  Dorel Zaharia (Gaz Metan Mediaș)
  Gigel Ene (Electromagnetica București)
  Radu Neguț (Pandurii Târgu Jiu)
  János Székely (Universitatea Cluj)

See also
2004–05 Divizia A

References

Liga II seasons
Rom
2004–05 in Romanian football